Charles Erskine, Earl of Mar (19 October 165023 May 1689) was a Scottish nobleman. He is regarded as both the 22nd earl (in the 1st creation) and the 5th earl (in the 7th).

He raised the 21st Regiment of Foot, or Royal Scots Fusiliers, in 1679, and became its first colonel. However, he was arrested shortly before his death.

On 2 April 1674, he married Mary Maule, daughter of George Maule, 2nd Earl of Panmure. Their son John Erskine succeeded to the title.

References

1650 births
1689 deaths
Erskine, Charles
Charles
Royal Scots Fusiliers officers
Members of the Convention of the Estates of Scotland 1689
17th-century Scottish peers
Lords Erskine